Texas Proposition 5 may refer to various ballot measures in Texas, including:

2007 Texas Proposition 5
2021 Texas Proposition 5